Air Vice-Marshal Matthew John Gethin Wiles,  (born 1961) is a retired senior commander in the Royal Air Force who previously served as the Air Secretary.

Wiles was commissioned into the Royal Air Force as a flying officer in 1979. He served as Assistant Chief of Staff for Personnel and Logistics at Permanent Joint Headquarters and then went on to be Director General of the Joint Supply Chain at Defence Equipment and Support in 2008. He was appointed Commander of the Order of the British Empire (CBE) in the 2008 New Year Honours before he became Air Secretary in September 2011. He was appointed Companion of the Order of the Bath (CB) in the 2013 Birthday Honours.

References

Living people
Royal Air Force air marshals
1961 births
Commanders of the Order of the British Empire
Companions of the Order of the Bath